Jeong Gang-uk (born 1 May 1970) is a South Korean handball player. He competed in the men's tournament at the 1992 Summer Olympics.

References

External links
 

1970 births
Living people
South Korean male handball players
Olympic handball players of South Korea
Handball players at the 1992 Summer Olympics
Place of birth missing (living people)
Asian Games medalists in handball
Handball players at the 1994 Asian Games
Handball players at the 1998 Asian Games
Asian Games gold medalists for South Korea
Medalists at the 1994 Asian Games
Medalists at the 1998 Asian Games
20th-century South Korean people